Thomas Alsbury may refer to:

Thomas Alsbury (Texas settler) (born 1773), Early Texas settler from Old Three Hundred
A. Thomas Alsbury (1904–1990), Canadian politician